Brian Palmer may refer to:

 Brian Palmer (motivational speaker), president of National Speakers Bureau in Libertyville, Illinois
 Brian Palmer (social anthropologist) (born 1964), social anthropologist and academic of religion at Uppsala University

See also
Bryan Palmer, rugby player